Ka'b ibn Lu'ayy  is an ancestor of the Islamic prophet Muhammad in Arabic tradition.

Ancestry
Ka'b Lu'ayy was born in c. 305, in Mecca, Saudi Arabia to Lu'ayy ibn Ghalib and Ma'wiya bint Ka`b ibn al-Qayn ibn Jasr ibn Shay' Allah ibn Asad ibn Wabara ibn Taghlib ibn Hulwan ibn Imran ibn al-Haf ibn Quda'a. Her (Ma'wiyah's) mother was 'Atikah bint Kahil Ibn 'Udhrah.

Family
Ka'b ibn Lu'ayy had two full brothers ('Amir and Samah); the three of them were known as the Banu Najiyah.

They also had a paternal half-brother whose descendants regarded themselves as part of the Banu Ghatafan, becoming a part of them. This brother was called 'Awf ibn Lu'ayy and his mother was al-Baridah bint 'Awf ibn Ghanm ibn 'Abd Allah ibn Ghatafan. It is said that when her husband, Lu'ayy ibn Ghalib died, she went back with her son 'Awf to her own tribe (Banu Ghatafan) and married Sa'd ibn Dhubyan ibn Baghid, who adopted 'Awf ibn Lu'ayy. Addressing 'Awf, Fazara ibn Dhubyan is reported to have said:

Son of Lu'ayy, turn your camel aside to me;
Your own people have abandoned you and you have
no dwelling place.

Also, Ka'b had two more paternal half-brothers. One of these was Khuzaymah, known as A'idhat Quraish after his mother, A'idhah bint al-Khims ibn Quhafah ibn Kath'am. The other was Sa'd, whose descendants were known as the Bunanah, after Sa'd's mother, Bunanah.

See also
Family tree of Muhammad

References

Ancestors of Muhammad
4th-century Arabs
305 births
Year of death unknown